Andre Agassi defeated Andriy Medvedev in the final, 1–6, 2–6, 6–4, 6–3, 6–4 to win the men's singles tennis title at the 1999 French Open. With the win, Agassi became the second man, after Rod Laver, to complete a career Grand Slam in the Open Era. He also achieved a career Super Slam (having previously won Olympic gold and the year-end championships), the only men's singles player to do so.

Carlos Moyá was the defending champion, but lost in the fourth round to Agassi.

This tournament was also the first major in which future 20-time Grand Slam champion and world No. 1 Roger Federer and future French Open champion Gaston Gaudio competed in the main draw; they lost to Patrick Rafter and Àlex Corretja in the first round and third round, respectively.

Seeds

Qualifying draw

Draw

Finals

Top half

Section 1

Section 2

Section 3

Section 4

Bottom half

Section 5

Section 6

Section 7

Section 8

External links
Official Roland Garros 1999 Men's Singles Draw
1999 French Open Men's Singles draw – Association of Tennis Professionals (ATP)
1999 French Open – Men's draws and results at the International Tennis Federation

Men's Singles
French Open by year – Men's singles
1999 ATP Tour